Patricia Gabriela Jorge (usually just Gabriela Jorge) is an activist in the Workers' Party (Argentina).

In November 2013 she was elected as a provincial deputy in Salta Province for the provincial capital and is a member of the health commission.

Electoral history

2013 Election

External links 
result (Spanish)

References

Year of birth missing (living people)
Living people
21st-century Argentine women politicians
21st-century Argentine politicians
People from Salta
Workers' Party (Argentina) politicians